MIL-STD-810, U S Department of Defense Test Method Standard,  Environmental Engineering Considerations and Laboratory Tests, is a United States Military Standard that emphasizes tailoring an equipment's environmental design and test limits to the conditions that it will experience throughout its service life, and establishing chamber test methods that replicate the effects of environments on the equipment rather than imitating the environments themselves. Although prepared specifically for U.S. military applications, the standard is often applied for commercial products as well.

The standard's guidance and test methods are intended to:
 define environmental stress sequences, durations, and levels of equipment life cycles;
 be used to develop analysis and test criteria tailored to the equipment and its environmental life cycle;
 evaluate equipment's performance when exposed to a life cycle of environmental stresses
 identify deficiencies, shortcomings, and defects in equipment design, materials, manufacturing processes, packaging techniques, and maintenance methods; and
 demonstrate compliance with contractual requirements.

The document revision as of 2019 is U.S. MIL-STD-810H. It supersedes MIL-STD-810G, Change Notice 1 which was issued in 2014.

Cognizant agency 

MIL-STD-810 is maintained by a Tri-Service partnership that includes the United States Air Force, Army, and Navy.<ref>{{cite journal |year=2005 |title=Treatise Helps Users Interpret and Apply MIL-STD-810 — A Test Method Standard  |journal=Journal of the IEST |volume=48 |issue=1 |pages=147–151 |publisher=Institute of Environmental Sciences & Technology |url=http://iest.metapress.com/content/k8gw17538jl71314/fulltext.pdf |accessdate=27 Jun 2012|doi= 10.17764/jiet.48.1.k8gw17538jl71314}}</ref>  The U.S. Army Test and Evaluation Command, or ATEC,  serves as Lead Standardization Activity / Preparing Activity, and is chartered under the Defense Standardization Program (DSP)  with maintaining the functional expertise and serving as the DoD-wide technical focal point for the standard. The Institute of Environmental Sciences and Technology is the Administrator for WG-DTE043: MIL-STD-810, the Working Group that updates this constantly evolving standard. 

Scope and purpose of MIL-STD-810

MIL-STD-810 addresses a broad range of environmental conditions that include: low pressure for altitude testing; exposure to high and low temperatures plus temperature shock (both operating and in storage); rain (including wind blown and freezing rain); humidity, fungus, salt fog for rust testing; sand and dust exposure; explosive atmosphere;  leakage; acceleration; shock and transport shock;  gunfire vibration; and random vibration. The standard describes environmental management and engineering processes that can be of enormous value to generate confidence in the environmental worthiness and overall durability of a system design. The standard contains military acquisition program planning and engineering direction to consider the influences that environmental stresses have on equipment  throughout all phases of its service life. The document does not impose design or test specifications. Rather, it describes the environmental tailoring process that results in realistic materiel designs and test methods based on materiel system performance requirements.

Finally, there are limitations inherent in laboratory testing that make it imperative to use proper engineering judgment to extrapolate laboratory results to results that may be obtained under actual service conditions. In many cases, real-world environmental stresses (singularly or in combination) cannot be duplicated in test laboratories. Therefore, users should not assume that an item that passes laboratory testing also will pass field/fleet verification tests.

History and evolution of MIL-STD-810

In 1945, the Army Air Force (AAF) released the first specification providing a formal methodology for testing equipment under simulated environmental conditions. That document, entitled AAF Specification 41065, Equipment - General Specification for Environmental Test of, is the direct ancestor of MIL-STD-810. In 1965, the USAF released a technical report with data and information on the origination and development of natural and induced environmental tests intended for aerospace and ground equipment. By using that document, the design engineer obtained a clearer understanding of the interpretation, application, and relationship of environmental testing to military equipment and materiel.

The Institute of Environmental Sciences and Technology (IEST), a non-profit technical society, released the publication History and Rationale of MIL-STD-810 to capture the thought process behind the evolution of MIL-STD-810. It also provides a development history of test methods, rationale for many procedural changes, tailoring guidance for many test procedures, and insight into the future direction of the standard.

The MIL-STD-810 test series originally addressed generic laboratory environmental testing. The first edition of MIL-STD-810 in 1962 included only a single sentence allowing users to modify tests to reflect environmental conditions. Subsequent editions contained essentially the same phrase, but did not elaborate on the subject until MIL-STD-810D was issued marking one of the more significant revisions of the standard with its focus more on shock and vibration tests that closely mirrored real-world operating environments. MIL-STD-810F further defined test methods while continuing the concept of creating test chambers that simulate conditions likely to be encountered during a product's useful life rather than simply replicating the actual environments. More recently, MIL-STD-810G implements Test Method 527 calling for the use of multiple vibration exciters to perform multi-axis shaking that simultaneously excites all test article resonances and simulates real-world vibrations. This approach replaces the legacy approach of three distinct tests, that is, shaking a load first in its x axis, then its y axis, and finally in its z axis.

A matrix of the tests and methods of MIL-STD-810 through Revision G is available on the web and quite useful in comparing the changes among the various revisions .

The following table traces the specification's evolution in terms of environmental tailoring to meet a specific user's needs.

MIL-STD-810, Part one - General program guidelines

Part One of MIL-STD-810 describes management, engineering, and technical roles in the environmental design and test tailoring process. It focuses on the process of tailoring design and test criteria to the specific environmental conditions an equipment item is likely to encounter during its service life. New appendices support the succinctly presented text of Part One. It describes the tailoring process (i.e., systematically considering detrimental effects that various environmental factors may have on a specific equipment throughout its service life) and applies this process throughout the equipment's life cycle to meet user and interoperability needs.

MIL-STD-810, Part two - Laboratory test methods

Part Two of MIL-STD-810 contains the environmental laboratory test methods to be applied using the test tailoring guidelines described in Part One of the document. With the exception of Test Method 528, these methods are not mandatory, but rather the appropriate method is selected and tailored to generate the most relevant test data possible. Each test method in Part Two contains some environmental data and references, and it identifies particular tailoring opportunities.  Each test method supports the test engineer by describing preferred laboratory test facilities and methodologies. These environmental management and engineering processes can be of enormous value to generate confidence in the environmental worthiness and overall durability of equipment and materiel. Still, the user must recognize that there are limitations inherent in laboratory testing that make it imperative to use engineering judgment when extrapolating from  laboratory results to results that may be obtained under actual service conditions. In many cases, real-world environmental stresses (singularly or in combination) cannot be duplicated practically or reliably in test laboratories. Therefore, users should not assume that a system or component that passes laboratory tests of this standard also would pass field/fleet verification trials.

Specific examples of Test Methods called out in MIL-STD-810 are listed below:
 Test Method 500.6 Low Pressure (Altitude)
 Test Method 501.6 High Temperature
 Test Method 502.6 Low Temperature
 Test Method 503.6 Temperature Shock
 Test Method 504.2 Contamination by Fluids
 Test Method 505.6 Solar Radiation (Sunshine)
 Test Method 506.6 Rain
 Test Method 507.6 Humidity
 Test Method 508.7 Fungus
 Test Method 509.6 Salt Fog
 Test Method 510.6 Sand and Dust
 Test Method 511.6 Explosive Atmosphere
 Test Method 512.5 Immersion
 Test Method 513.7 Acceleration
 Test Method 514.7 Vibration
 Test Method 515.7 Acoustic Noise
 Test Method 516.7 Shock
 Test Method 517.2 Pyroshock
 Test Method 518.2 Acidic Atmosphere
 Test Method 519.7 Gunfire Shock
 Test Method 520.4 Temperature, Humidity, Vibration, and Altitude
 Test Method 521.4 Icing/Freezing Rain
 Test Method 522.2 Ballistic Shock
 Test Method 523.4 Vibro-Acoustic/Temperature
 Test Method 524.1 Freeze / Thaw
 Test Method 525.1 Time Waveform Replication
 Test Method 526.1 Rail Impact.
 Test Method 527.1 Multi-Exciter
 Test Method 528.1 Mechanical Vibrations of Shipboard Equipment (Type I – Environmental and Type II – Internally Excited)

MIL-STD-810, Part three - World climatic regions

Part Three contains a compendium of climatic data and guidance assembled from several sources, including AR 70-38, Research, Development, Test and Evaluation of Materiel for Extreme Climatic Conditions (1979), a draft version of AR 70-38 (1990) that was developed using Air Land Battlefield Environment (ALBE) report information, Environmental Factors and Standards for Atmospheric Obscurants, Climate, and Terrain (1987), and MIL-HDBK-310, Global Climatic Data for Developing Military Products. It also provides planning guidance for realistic consideration (i.e., starting points) of climatic conditions in various regions throughout the world.

Applicability to "ruggedized" consumer products

U.S. MIL-STD-810 is a flexible standard that allows users to tailor test methods to fit the application. As a result, a vendor's claims of "...compliance to U.S. MIL-STD-810..." can be misleading, because no commercial organization or agency certifies compliance, commercial vendors can create the test methods or approaches to fit their product. Suppliers can — and some do — take significant latitude with how they test their products, and how they report the test results. When queried, many manufacturers will admit no testing has actually been done and that the product is only designed/engineered/built-to comply with the standard. This is because many of the tests described can be expensive to perform and usually require special facilities. Consumers who require rugged products should verify which test methods that compliance is claimed against and which parameter limits were selected for testing. Also, if some testing was actually done they would have to specify: (i) against which test methods of the standard the compliance is claimed; (ii) to which parameter limits the items were actually tested; and (iii) whether the testing was done internally or externally by an independent testing facility.

Related documents
 Environmental Conditions for Airborne Equipment: The document DO-160G, Environmental Conditions and Test Procedures for Airborne Equipment outlines a set of minimal standard environmental test conditions (categories) and corresponding test procedures for airborne equipment. It is published by the RTCA, Inc, formerly known as Radio Technical Commission for Aeronautics  until their re-incorporation in 1991 as a not-for-profit corporation that functions as a Federal Advisory Committee pursuant to the United States Federal Advisory Committee Act.
 Environmental Test Methods for Defense Materiel: The Ministry of Defence (United Kingdom) provides requirements for environmental conditions experienced by defence materiel in service via the Defence Standard 00-35, Environmental Handbook for Defence Materiel (Part 3) Environmental Test Methods. The document contains environmental descriptions, a range of tests procedures and default test severities representing conditions that may be encountered during the equipment's life.
 NATO Environmental Guidelines for Defence Equipment: The North Atlantic Treaty Organization (NATO) provides guidance to project managers, programme engineers, and environmental engineering specialists in the planning and implementation of environmental tasks via the Allied Environmental Conditions and Test Publication (AECTP) 100, Environmental Guidelines for Defence Materiel. The current document, AECTP-100 (Edition 3), was released January 2006.
 Shock Testing Requirements for Naval Ships: The military specification  entitled MIL-DTL-901E,  Detail Specification, Shock Tests, H.I. (High-Impact) Shipboard Machinery, Equipment, and Systems, Requirements for (often mistakenly referred to as MIL-STD-901) covers shock testing requirements for ship board machinery, equipment, systems, and structures, excluding submarine pressure hull penetrations. Compliance to the document verifies the ability of shipboard installations to withstand shock loadings which may be incurred during wartime service due to the effects of nuclear or conventional weapons. The current specification was released 20 June 2017.
 IEST Vibration and Shock Testing Recommended Practices:'' These documents are peer-reviewed documents that outline how to do specific tests. They are published by the Institute of Environmental Sciences and Technology.

See also 
 IP Code
 Rugged computer
 EN 62262
 Industrial PC

References

External links 
 DOD MIL-STD-810 standard, Environmental Engineering Considerations and Laboratory Tests.

Military of the United States standards
Environmental testing